The Constitution of 1921 may refer to the:

March Constitution of Poland
Turkish Constitution of 1921
Louisiana Constitution of 1921
Vidovdan Constitution - first constitution of the Kingdom of Serbs, Croats and Slovenes passed on 28 June 1921